is a Japanese professional boxer who has held the WBO Asia Pacific mini-flyweight title since November 2021. As of June 2022, he is ranked as the world's eight-best active mini-flyweight by BoxRec.

Early life and amateur career
Yudai is the older brother of fellow boxer Ginjiro Shigeoka.

While attending the Kaishin High School, Shigeoka won four national titles as a pinweight. In 2018, Shigeoka won the All Japan Boxing Championship as a light flyweight, and reached the finals of the World University Championships in Russia, once again as a light flyweight. Shigeoka intended to compete in the 2020 Olympic Games while attending the Takushoku University, but decided to drop out of university and become a professional after the junior flyweight division was expunged from the Games. Shigeoka was given his professional boxing license on August 1, 2019. He finished his amateur career with a record of 82–10, with 20 victories coming by way of stoppage.

Professional boxing career
Shigeoka made his professional debut on 30 October 2019, against Manop Audomphanawari, at the Korakuen Hall in Tokyo, Japan. He won the fight by technical knockout in the second round, dropping Manop with repeated body shots at the 2:16 minute mark. Two months later, on 10 December 2019, Shigeoka was scheduled to face the reigning OPBF minimumweight champion Lito Dante in a six round non-title bout. He won the fight by unanimous decision, with scores of 59-55, 60-54 and 59-55.

Shigeoka was scheduled to fight Ryu Horikawa for the vacant Japanese Youth light flyweight title on 11 February 2021, after a fourteen-month layoff. He won the fight by a fifth-round technical knockout. Horikawa was first knocked down with a left straight in the third round, and once again in the fifth round. Following the second knockdown, referee Akihiko Katsuragi decided to wave the fight off. Shigeoka vacated the title on August 2, 2021.

Shigeoka was scheduled to face the former OPBF minimumweight champion Tsubasa Koura for the vacant WBO Asia Pacific mini flyweight title on 12 November 2021. It was Shigeoka's first career twelve round bout. Koura was furthermore seen as a huge step up in class compared to his previous opponents. Shigeoka won the closely contested fight by majority decision, with two judges scoring the fight 115-113 in his favor, while the third judge scored the fight as a 114-114 draw. Shigeoka was booked to make his first title defense against the #10 ranked challenger Cris Ganoza on July 7, 2022. Shigeoka won the fight by a third-round knockout, after dropping Ganoza with a left hook to the body, which left him unable to beat the ten-count.

Shigeoka faced the #1 ranked Japanese minumumweight contender in a Japanese title eliminator on 17 November 2022. The bout was later upgraded to a vacant Japanese title bout, as Shigeoka's brother Ginjiro vacated the belt on 29 July. He won the fight by a third-round knockout. Shigeoka vacated the title on 2 December 2022.

Shigeoka is scheduled to challenge Petchmanee CP Freshmart for the WBC mini-flyweight title on 23 April 2023, at the Yoyogi National Gymnasium in Tokyo, Japan. The title fight is expected to headline "3150Fight Vol. 5", which will be broadcast by Abema TV.

Professional boxing record

References

1997 births
Living people
Sportspeople from Kumamoto Prefecture
Japanese male boxers
Mini-flyweight boxers
Light-flyweight boxers
21st-century Japanese people